A number of vessels of the United States Navy have borne the name Littlehales, after George W. Littlehales.

 , a  lighter, in service from 1952 until 1968.
 , a hydrographic survey vessel, in service from 1992 until 2003.

References 

United States Navy ship names